"You're My Kind of Climate" is a song by the English post-punk band Rip Rig + Panic. It was released as a single on 3 June 1982.

Formats and track listing 
All lyrics by Gareth Sager, all music by Sean Oliver, Gareth Sager, Bruce Smith and Mark Springer.
UK 7" single (VS 507)
"You're My Kind of Climate" – 2:50
"She Gets So Hungry at Night She Eats Her Jewellery" – 5:54

UK 12" single (VS 507(12))
"You're My Kind of Climate" – 6:05
"She Gets So Hungry at Night She Eats Her Jewellery" – 5:54

Accolades

Personnel
Adapted from the You're My Kind of Climate liner notes.

Rip Rig + Panic
 Neneh Cherry – lead vocals
 Sean Oliver – bass guitar
 Gareth Sager – guitar, piano
 Bruce Smith – drums, percussion
 Mark Springer – piano
Additional musicians
 David Defries – trumpet
 Giles Leaman – additional drums and percussion
 Jez Parfitt – baritone saxophone
 Steve Noble – additional drums and percussion
 Sarah Sarahandi – viola

Additional musicians (cont.)
 Alf Waite – trombone
 Dave "Flash" Wright – tenor saxophone
Production and additional personnel
 Jean Cocteau – photography
 Howard Gray – engineering
 Dave Hunt – engineering
 Lester Johnston – engineering
 Adam Kidron – engineering
 Jill Mumford – design
 Rip Rig + Panic – production, design
 Sid Rudland – engineering

Release history

References

External links 
 

1982 songs
1982 singles
Rip Rig + Panic songs
Virgin Records singles
Songs written by Sean Oliver
Songs written by Gareth Sager
Songs written by Bruce Smith (musician)
Songs written by Mark Springer (musician)